Angelo Barovier (in Venice – 1460, in Venice) was an Italian glass artist. Raised in a family with a long tradition of glass working, Barovier was certainly the best-known member and significant for uniting the knowledge passed down for generations as an artist and a scientist.

Biographical details about Barovier are few and fragmentary, but relate his ability in the treatment of glass. The humanist Ludovico Carbone, for example, described Angelum Venetum as optimum artificem crystallinorum vasorum (largest producer of crystalline vessels). Another testimony to the high esteem for Barovier is the decree of Venetian Republic in around 1455 that granted him the exclusive rights to production of clean glass, produced by a technique he developed, which he called crystal glass or Venetian crystal. According to some, Barovier should be recognized for originally developing a glass paste called Chalcedony.

At the request of Filaret, architect of the Dukes of Milan, Barovier was summoned in 1455 at the court of Milan in order to suggest the best glass paste to be used in the construction of Sforzinda, the ideal city desired by Francesco Sforza and designed (but never implemented) by the same Filaret.

There are no known true works of Barovier, although some historians assign him a wedding Cup in the museum of the glass Murano, the cup of birds to Trent and a blue glass in the City Museum Medieval of Bologna.

The Barovier family

The name Barovier comes from the word berroviere, which indicates the armiger guarding the captain of the people. It is likely that a Barovier, originally from Treviso, settled in Murano around the 1291, when a law of Republic required all glassworkers to live on the island. The oldest representative of the family of which we know is Jacobello (born around 1295), whose sons Anthony and Bartholomew are mentioned in documents of 1348 as fiolari (glassmakers). A son of Bartholomew, James, remembered as a master glassmaker and a furnace owner, was the father of Barovier.

See also 
 Barovier & Toso

References

Year of birth unknown
1480 deaths
Italian glass artists
Republic of Venice artists